Simon Phillips is a British Internet artist and producer. He was a music producer as a member of the Orb and founding member of Prayerbox. After setting up various websites named for famous people including Damien Hirst, he was threatened with legal action in 2006.

References

External links
Prayerbox Website

English electronic musicians
English record producers
Place of birth missing (living people)
Year of birth missing (living people)
The Orb members
Living people